This is a list of official state instruments.

References

External links

Instruments
United States